The Women's 200 metres T37 event at the 2012 Summer Paralympics took place at the London Olympic Stadium on 2 September. The event consisted of 2 heats and a final.

Records
Prior to the competition, the existing World and Paralympic records were as follows:

Results

Round 1
Competed 2 September 2012 from 11:05. Qual. rule: first 3 in each heat (Q) plus the 2 fastest other times (q) qualified.

Heat 1

Heat 2

Final
Competed 2 September 2012 at 20:17.

 
Q = qualified by place. q = qualified by time. RR = Regional Record. PB = Personal Best. SB = Seasonal Best.

References

Athletics at the 2012 Summer Paralympics
2012 in women's athletics